Canton, officially the Charter Township of Canton, is a charter township of Wayne County in the U.S. state of Michigan. As of the 2020 census, the township had a population of 98,659.

Canton Township is Michigan's second most-populated township (after Clinton Township) and ninth most-populated municipality overall. The township is ranked as the 96th highest-income place in the United States with a population of 50,000 or more and is also consistently ranked as one of the safest cities in the state and nation. In 2015, the township was ranked as the 29th safest city in the United States.

Communities
Canton is an unincorporated community within the township, although the name often refers to the whole township itself. The Canton post office, first established in 1852, serves an area conterminous with the township itself—using the 48187 ZIP code north of Cherry Hill Road and the 48188 ZIP Code to the south.
It is the site of a new urbanist neighborhood with architecture that is supposed to be reminiscent of what Canton was like a hundred years ago. It is located on a rise over a branch of the Lower River Rouge. It is now the site of a theatre, the Village Theater.
It is named after Timothy F. Sheldon who purchased lands there in 1825. The Sheldons built a Greek Revival home on their land, and the building, the Sheldon Inn, almost immediately became an inn, serving the influx of travelers and settlers spreading westward from Detroit.

History
Earlier, on October 20, 1829, the legislature had passed a bill creating the townships of Lima and Richland out of Bucklin Township. Governor Lewis Cass returned the acts unapproved, citing a conflict under the law. The names conflicted with post offices in existence, contrary to a territorial law from April 12, 1827, prohibiting incorporation of a new township bearing the same name as any existing post office. The legislature thus had to substitute the names of Nankin and Pekin after the cities of Nanjing (Nanking) and Beijing (Peking) in China. The name of Pekin was extinguished when it was renamed Redford in 1833.

The Township of Canton was created by act of the Michigan Territorial Legislature on March 7, 1834, out of a southern portion of Plymouth Township. It was named in honor of the port and provincial capital known historically as Canton, Imperial China, known today from the pinyin standard as Guangzhou.

The first meeting to organize the township was held in April 1834.

In the summer of 2002, the emerald ash borer was discovered in Canton, eventually infesting the Great Lakes region.

The Canton Historical Society and Museum opened in 1982 in a one-roomed schoolhouse.

Geography

The south of the township is drained by the Lower River Rouge and its tributaries, including Pine Creek, which drains from the northwest corner to the southeast. The northeast is drained by Tonquish Creek and Garden Creek, which are tributaries of the Middle River Rouge.

Economy

Top employers
According to the Charter Township's 2010 Comprehensive Annual Financial Report, the top employers in the city are:

The publisher Visible Ink Press has its headquarters in Canton.

Transportation

Highways

, named locally as Michigan Avenue
, named locally as Ford Road

Airport
 Canton–Plymouth Mettetal Airport

Education
Canton Township is served by the Plymouth-Canton Community Schools (which serves the northern 2/3 portion of Canton), Wayne-Westland Community Schools (which serves the south-eastern portion of Canton) and Van Buren Public Schools (which serves the south-western portion of the township). P-CCS includes most of Canton Township, the city of Plymouth, Plymouth Township, and portions of Salem, Superior, and Northville Townships.

Schools

Wayne-Westland Community Schools
A portion is in Wayne-Westland Community Schools Most Wayne-Westland-zoned areas are zoned to Walker-Winter Elementary School in Canton. A small portion is zoned to Roosevelt-McGrath Elementary School in Wayne.

Some portions of the Wayne-Westland section of Canton are zoned to Adams Upper Elementary School in Westland, Franklin Middle School in Wayne, and Wayne Memorial High School in Wayne. Other portions are zoned to Marshall Upper Elementary School, Stevenson Middle School in Westland, John Glenn High School, all in Westland.

Plymouth-Canton Community Schools
A portion is in the Plymouth-Canton Community Schools.
Bentley Elementary School
Bird Elementary School
Canton High School *
Discovery Middle School
Dodson Elementary School
East Middle School
Eriksson Elementary School
Farrand Elementary School
Field Elementary School
Gallimore Elementary School
Hoben Elementary School
Hulsing Elementary School
Isbister Elementary School
Liberty Middle School
Miller Elementary School
Pioneer Middle School
Plymouth High School *
Salem High School *
Smith Elementary School
Starkweather Center (Alternative education)
Tanger Center (Alternative education)
Tonda Elementary School
West Middle School
Workman Elementary School

(* Part of the Plymouth-Canton Educational Park)

Public charter schools
Canton Charter Academy
Achieve Charter Academy
South Canton Scholars Charter Academy
Plymouth Scholars Charter Academy
Canton Preparatory High School

Private schools
All Saints Catholic School
Plymouth Christian Academy
Plymouth Canton Montessori
Crescent Academy International
Banyan Montessori Academy

Further education
Michigan Institute of Aviation and Technology

Crime
In 2015, Canton was ranked as the 29th safest city in the U.S.

Demographics

The U.S. Census Bureau also defined Canton Township as a census-designated place (CDP) at the 2000 Census so that the community would appear on the list of places (like cities and villages) as well on the list of county subdivisions (like other townships).  The final statistics for the township and the CDP were identical.

As of the census of 2010, there were 90,173 people, 32,771 households, and 24,231 families residing in the township. The racial makeup of the township was 72.2% White, 10.2% African American, 0.2% Native American, 14.1% Asian (8.0% Indian, 2.2% Chinese, 0.7% Filipino), 0.0% Pacific Islander, 0.7% from other races, and 1.91% from two or more races. Hispanic or Latino of any race were 3.1% of the population.

There were 27,490 households, out of which 42.0% had children under the age of 18 living with them, 63.4% were married couples living together, 8.6% had a female householder with no husband present, and 25.2% were non-families. 20.5% of all households were made up of individuals, and 4.8% had someone living alone who was 65 years of age or older.  The average household size was 2.77 and the average family size was 3.26. The median household price was $239,900 according to the U.S. Census Bureau's 2006 American Community Survey estimates.

In the township the population was spread out, with 29.0% under the age of 18, 8.0% from 18 to 24, 34.9% from 25 to 44, 22.1% from 45 to 64, and 5.9% who were 65 years of age or older.  The median age was 33 years. For every 100 females, there were 98.0 males.  For every 100 females age 18 and over, there were 96.2 males.

According to a 2007 estimate, the median income for a household in the township was $82,669, and the median income for a family was $95,267. Males had a median income of $61,570 versus $35,615 for females. The per capita income for the township was $28,609.  About 2.9% of families and 3.7% of the population were below the poverty line, including 4.2% of those under age 18 and 5.5% of those age 65 or over.

Notable people

Precious Adams, ballet dancer who was born and raised in Canton
 Andrew Bazzi, Singer-Songwriter
 Kyle Brindza,  American football placekicker, played for the Detroit Lions, Tampa Bay Buccaneers, and New York Jets
 Brian Calhoun, back-up running back for the Detroit Lions
 Paul Cotter, American professional ice hockey forward
 Alex Foster, American professional ice hockey forward player
 Michael Jordan, collegiate football player for Ohio State and current member of the Carolina Panthers
 Robert L. McKenzie, also known as Bobby McKenzie, a domestic and foreign policy analyst, public commentator, and scholar of the Middle East and North Africa. He is a visiting fellow at the Brookings Institution, a former Democratic nominee for Michigan's 11th congressional district, and a former Senior Advisor at the US Department of State.
 Alec Pantaleo, 2022 U.S. Open National Champion in freestyle wrestling, three-time NCAA wrestling All-American at Michigan
 Nathan Perkovich, forward for the Medvescak Zagreb of KHL and Albany Devils of AHL; grew up in Canton
 Nate Robertson, former MLB pitcher for the Detroit Tigers, Florida Marlins, and Philadelphia Phillies
 Matt Roy, professional ice hockey player
 Allison Schmitt, Olympic gold medalist swimmer in 2012 Summer Olympics and 2016 Summer Olympics; Team USA swim captain
 Jason Stollsteimer, vocalist and guitarist of the band The Von Bondies, attended Plymouth-Canton Educational Park
Emily Turner, professional basketball player in the Women's National Basketball Association
 Charles Williams (ice hockey), professional hockey player
 James Wisniewski, defenseman for the Carolina Hurricanes; previously with Anaheim Ducks, Columbus Blue Jackets, Chicago Blackhawks, New York Islanders, and Montreal Canadiens; born in Canton

Gallery

References

External links

Canton Historical Society
Canton Township in History of Detroit and Wayne County and early Michigan, Farmer, Silas, 1839–1902.

 
Townships in Wayne County, Michigan
Charter townships in Michigan
Metro Detroit
1834 establishments in Michigan Territory
Populated places established in 1834
Former census-designated places in Michigan